Nikola "Nick" Rakocevic (born December 31, 1997) is a Serbian professional basketball player who last played for the Magnolia Hotshots of the Philippine Basketball Association (PBA). He played college basketball for the USC Trojans and attended St. Joseph High School in Westchester, IL. Born in the United States, he represents Serbia internationally.

High school career
 
Rakocevic was born in Chicago to Momo and Denise Rakocevic. His father emigrated from Belgrade, Serbia at age 25. Rakocevic played for St. Joseph High School in Westchester, Illinois under coach Gene Pingatore. As a junior, he was a starter on the Class 3A state championship team. In his senior season, Rakocevic averaged 19.8 points, 14.4 rebounds and four blocks per game, leading his team to the Class 3A Westinghouse Sectional title. He earned First Team All-State honors from the Chicago Tribune. On April 11, 2016, he committed to play college basketball for USC over offers from UNLV, Arizona State and Florida.

College career
Rakocevic averaged 5.2 points and 4.2 rebounds per game as a freshman at USC, serving as a part-time starter. On March 13, 2018, he recorded 24 points and a career-high 19 rebounds in a 103–98 double overtime win over UNC Asheville. He grabbed the most rebounds by a USC player in a game since David Bluthenthal in 2000. As a sophomore, Rakocevic averaged 8.1 points and 6.2 rebounds per game, shooting 62.7 percent, the second-highest field goal percentage in program history. In his junior season, he averaged 14.7 points, 9.3 rebounds and 1.4 blocks per game. Rakocevic was a two-time Pac-12 Player of the Week and was named All-Pac-12 Honorable Mention. On November 12, 2019, he tied his career-high of 27 points, grabbed 16 rebounds and reached 1,000 career points, in an 84–66 victory over South Dakota State. As a senior, Rakocevic averaged 10.5 points and 8.3 rebounds per game.

Professional career
On September 16, 2020, Rakocevic signed his first professional contract with the Zhejiang Golden Bulls of the Chinese Basketball Association (CBA).

In August 2022, he signed with the Magnolia Hotshots of the Philippine Basketball Association (PBA) as the team's import for the 2022–23 PBA Commissioner's Cup.

National team career
Rakocevic played for the Serbia under-20 national team at the 2017 FIBA U20 European Championship in Greece. He averaged 6.3 points and 3.9 rebounds per game, helping his team finish in fifth place.

Career statistics

College

|-
| style="text-align:left;"| 2016–17
| style="text-align:left;"| USC
| 36 || 8 || 14.9 || .563 || – || .671 || 3.7 || .4 || .3 || .6 || 5.2
|-
| style="text-align:left;"| 2017–18
| style="text-align:left;"| USC
| 36 || 22 || 21.1 || .627 || – || .548 || 6.2 || .5 || .7 || .5 || 8.1
|-
| style="text-align:left;"| 2018–19
| style="text-align:left;"| USC
| 33 || 30 || 30.0 || .548 || .000 || .679 || 9.3 || 1.3 || .8 || 1.4 || 14.7
|-
| style="text-align:left;"| 2019–20
| style="text-align:left;"| USC
| 31 || 29 || 27.3 || .458 || .429 || .634 || 8.3 || 1.5 || 1.2 || 1.0 || 10.5
|- class="sortbottom"
| style="text-align:center;" colspan="2"| Career
| 136 || 89 || 23.1 || .540 || .360 || .643 || 6.8 || .9 || .7 || .9 || 9.5

References

External links
USC Trojans bio

1997 births
Living people
American expatriate basketball people in China
American expatriate basketball people in the Philippines
American men's basketball players
American people of Serbian descent
Basketball players from Chicago
Magnolia Hotshots players
Philippine Basketball Association imports
Power forwards (basketball)
Serbian expatriate basketball people in China
Serbian expatriate basketball people in the Philippines
Serbian men's basketball players
USC Trojans men's basketball players